Stavropol State Agrarian University is a state institution of higher education in Stavropol, Northern Caucasus. The previous title of the University is Stavropol State Agricultural Academy.

History
1930 – as a result of Moscow Zootechnic Institute’s reorganization four education institutions were established: Moscow Zootechnic Institute of horse breeding based on the Horse Breeding Faculty, Moscow Cattle Institute, Moscow Sheep-breeding Institute and Moscow Veterinarian Institute. Moscow Sheep-breeding institute had been working in Moscow for two years and then was moved completely in Northern Caucasus to put the main production base – fine-wooled sheep-breeding - closer.

1933 – Krasnodar Sheep-breeding Institute and Taganrog Institute Department of dairy&meat cattle breeding joined the Institute. It was renamed as Northern Caucasian Zootechnic Institute.

1940 - All-Soviet Union Sheep Breeding Research Institute of People's Commissariat for Agriculture.

1970 – Institution Preparation Department was established. Admission was performed by agricultural ventures’, agrarian production leaders’ and joiners’ specialities.

1976 – the Institute was awarded with Order of the Red Banner of Labour for merits of highly skilled agrarian specialists’ training, for development and implement of scientific achievements into agrarian performance.

1994 - State Higher Education Committee made a decision to transform the Institution into the Stavropol State Agricultural Academy.

2001 – the Academy was renamed as Stavropol State Agrarian University.

Executives
Chief officers of the Northern Caucasian Zootechnic Institute

1930–1934 – Viktor Viktorovitch Viktor

1934–1937 – Yan Yanovitch Virs

1937–1938 – Aleksey Ivanovitch Mikhalin

Chief officer of Voroshilov Zooveterinarian Institute

1938–1941 – Gerasim Khrisanfovitch Alafinov

Chief officers of the Stavropol State Agricultural Institute

1942–1955 – Feodosiy Vasilyevitch Kozel

1955–1961 – Ignatiy Prokofyevitch Salmin

Rectors of the Stavropol Agrarian Institute

1961–1968 – Aleksandr Ivanovitch Zhukov

1968–1984 – Viktor Ivanovitch Lisunov

1984–1999 – Viktor Yakovlevitch Nikitin, Honoured Scientist of RSFSR, member of International Agrarian Education Academy, member of International Higher School Academy, member of International IT Academy, Honoured Citizen of Stavropol Region

Rector of the Stavropol State Agrarian University
Since 1999 – Vladimir Ivanovitch Trukhachev. Doctor of Science in Agriculture, Doctor of Science, Economics, professor; associate of Russian Academy of Agricultural Sciences; Honored Scientist of Russian Federation; Honored Worker in higher professional education of Russian Federation; Honoured Worker in science and technology of Russian Federation; Honoured Worker in Russian agricultural sector; member of the international Academy of Agricultural Sciences; member of Russian Academy of natural sciences; member of International Academy of Higher Education; member of International Academy of scientific discovery and invention authors; member of International Academy of security and law order problems; Stavropol Hero of Labour; member of All-Russian Excellence Organization.

Performance
According to the license the University has a right to perform an education activity including 126 programs of HPE (specialist, bachelor, master's degree program), where 18.500 students are studying. University structure consists of 9 faculties, 51 chairs, 90 innovation labs and centers, techno-park “UniverAgro”, publishing complex “AGRUS”, 32 minor innovation ventures, horse physical culture school, vivarium, research library.
The number of Stavropol State Agrarian University staff is 1405 men including 698 teachers. 92,1% of teaching staff has a science-degree, and the average age of staff is 39.
Stavropol State Agrarian University has 66 countries-members, 136 strategic partners, 51 branch chairs on the basis of employers. Every year 235 contracts on creative collaboration are signed. SSAU is the member of Great University Charter since 2008. 56 international programs and projects are being implemented.
Stavropol State Agrarian University is the unique institution of higher education awarded with the title of  Prize winner of RF Government.
The finalist of European competition “EFQM Excellence Award”. The SSAU staff became the first Russian finalist of the EFQM Excellence Award competition in 2008, and the first organization-winner of European competition EFQM “Excellence award-2010”. In 2012 the University won the International Diamond Prize for Excellence in Quality (European Society Quality Research), a vanity award.

Faculties
Faculty of Agronomy

Faculty of Veterinarian Medicine

Faculty of Plants Protection

Faculty of Agricultural Mechanization

Faculty of Hospitality Business and Tourism

Faculty of Technological Management

Accounting and finance faculty

Faculty of Economics

Faculty of Electrification in Agriculture

Notable alumni
Gorbachev Mikhail Sergeevich - the recipient of the Nobel Peace Prize (1990), the President of the USSR (1990–1991).

Zerenkov Valery Georgievich. - Governor of the Stavropol Territory (since 2012).

Bely Yuri Vasilevich - Chairman of the fifth convocation Duma of the Stavropol Territory (since 2011).

Trukhachev Vladimir Ivanovich - Professor, Honored Scientist of the Russian Federation, Corresponding Member of the Russian Academy of Agricultural Sciences, Rector of the Stavropol State Agrarian University.

Velikdan Nicholay Timofeevich - Deputy Chairman of the Stavropol Territory Government.

Dzhatdoev Andrey Khasanovich - Head of Stavropol Administration.

Timofeeva Olga Viktorovna - Deputy of the State Duma of the Russian Federation (since 2011).

Martychev Alexander Vasilevich - Agriculture Minister of the Stavropol Territory (since 2012)

Nagaev Alexander Alexandrovich – Vice-chief of the Agriculture Minister of the Stavropol Territory (since 2013).

Ridny Sergey Dmitrievich - Vice-chief of the Agriculture Minister of the Stavropol Territory (since 2013).

Karabut Alexander Pavlovich - Minister of Social Welfare of the Stavropol Territory (since 2005).

Kuznetsov Eugeniy Semenovich - Governor of the Stavropol Territory (1991–1995).

Khubiev Vladimir Islamovich – the head of the Karachayevo-Cherkessian Republic (1990–1999).

Mikhaylenko Vitaliy Islamovich – the head of the Caucasian Mineral Waters Administration – the first deputy chairman of the Stavropol Territory Government (1998–2008).

Aboneev Vasily Vasilevich - Honored Worker of Science of the Russian Federation, Corresponding Member of the Russian Academy of Agricultural Sciences.

Ishchenko Alexander Nikolaevich - Professor, prize winner of the Russian Federation Government in the field of science and technology.

Moroz Vasily Andreevich - Hero of Socialist Labor, Academician of the RAAS, honored livestock specialist of RSFSR.

References

External links
Official website
University graduates
Stavropol SAU awards

Stavropol
Agricultural universities and colleges in Russia
Universities in Stavropol Krai